Rooikrantz Dam is a dam on the Buffalo River, about 15 km northwest of King William's Town in the Eastern Cape, South Africa. It lies due east of the larger and newer Sandile Dam.

See also
List of reservoirs and dams in South Africa
List of rivers of South Africa

References 
 List of South African Dams from the Department of Water Affairs

Dams in South Africa